Benjamin Thomas (born 12 September 1995) is a French professional road and track cyclist, who currently rides for UCI WorldTeam .

He rode at the 2015 UCI Track Cycling World Championships. In August 2018, he was named in the startlist for the 2018 Vuelta a España. In October 2020, he was named in the startlist for the 2020 Giro d'Italia.

He rode the Tour de France for the first time in 2022. On stage 15, Thomas broke away from the Peloton and was attempting to get the first French win in over thirty stages, but was caught inside the final few hundred meters. After the stage he commented, "I believed I could make it. If we could have stayed together with Alexis maybe it would have been different… I'm completely dead, I'm seeing stars. I was not thinking anymore."

Major results

Track

2016
 UEC European Championships
1st  Team pursuit
2nd  Madison (with Morgan Kneisky)
3rd  Omnium
 2nd  Madison (with Morgan Kneisky), UCI World Championships
2017
 UCI World Championships
1st  Madison (with Morgan Kneisky)
1st  Omnium
 UEC European Championships
1st  Madison (with Florian Maitre)
1st  Team pursuit
3rd  Omnium
 UCI World Cup, Manchester
1st Omnium
2nd Madison
3rd Team pursuit
 1st Six Days of Fiorenzuola (with Morgan Kneisky)
 2nd Six Days of Ghent (with Morgan Kneisky)
2018
 1st Six Days of Fiorenzuola (with Morgan Kneisky)
2019
 1st  Omnium, UEC European Championships
 2nd  Omnium, UCI World Championships
2020
 1st  Omnium, UCI World Championships
2021
 UCI World Championships
1st  Points race
2nd  Team pursuit
 1st  Points race, UEC European Championships
 3rd  Madison (with Donavan Grondin), Olympic Games
2022
 UCI World Championships
1st  Madison (with Donavan Grondin)
2nd  Omnium
2023
 UEC European Championships
1st  Omnium
3rd  Madison (with Donavan Grondin)
3rd  Team pursuit

Road

2017
 1st Stage 3 Four Days of Dunkirk
 3rd Overall Tour de Wallonie
1st  Young rider classification
1st Stage 1
 4th Overall Tour de Luxembourg
 4th Overall Tour du Poitou-Charentes
 4th Road race, National Under-23 Championships
 4th Grand Prix Pino Cerami
 4th Ronde van Limburg
 9th Boucles de l'Aulne
2018
 1st  Young rider classification, Étoile de Bessèges
 3rd Time trial, National Championships
2019
 1st  Time trial, National Championships
 6th Tour du Finistère
2020
 2nd Time trial, National Championships
 6th Overall Tour Poitou-Charentes en Nouvelle-Aquitaine
2021
 1st  Time trial, National Championships
2022
 1st  Overall Étoile de Bessèges
1st Stage 3
 1st  Overall Boucles de la Mayenne
1st Stage 2
 National Championships
3rd Time trial
5th Road race
 4th Overall Tour Poitou-Charentes en Nouvelle-Aquitaine
 5th Tour du Doubs
 8th Overall Tour de Luxembourg
 8th Bretagne Classic

Grand Tour general classification results timeline

References

External links
 
 
 
 
 
 
 

1995 births
Living people
French male cyclists
French track cyclists
Olympic cyclists of France
Olympic bronze medalists for France
Olympic medalists in cycling
Cyclists at the 2020 Summer Olympics
Medalists at the 2020 Summer Olympics
UCI Track Cycling World Champions (men)
People from Lavaur, Tarn
Sportspeople from Tarn (department)
Cyclists from Occitania (administrative region)